Rezvan Rural District is a rural district (dehestan) in Ferdows District, Rafsanjan County, Kerman Province, Iran. At the 2006 census, its population was 8,070, in 2,044 families. The rural district has 15 villages.

References 

Rural Districts of Kerman Province
Rafsanjan County